Stampin may refer to:
Stampin
Stampin (federal constituency), represented in the Dewan Rakyat
Stampin (state constituency), formerly represented in the Sarawak State Legislative Assembly (1979–91)